KIAI (93.9  FM) is a commercial radio station that serves the areas of Mason City, Iowa and Austin–Albert Lea, Minnesota.  The station broadcasts a Country format.  KIAI is owned by Alpha Media, through licensee Digity 3E License, LLC, which owns several other radio stations in Iowa and Minnesota.

The station was originally licensed as KNIQ on April 9, 1985, but changed callsigns to KIAI on October 4, 1991.

The transmitter and broadcast tower are located 4 miles east of Mason City along 280th Street.

References

External links
 KIAI website

IAI
Mason City, Iowa
Alpha Media radio stations